Endla Nature Reserve is a nature reserve situated in central Estonia.

The Endla nature reserve protects a fresh-water system of mires, bogs, springs and rivulets. As such, it plays an important role in recharging the waters of the Põltsamaa River. The flora is dominated by pine shrubs and reed beds. Several threatened species of orchid can be found in the nature reserve. Rare or threatened birds also use the area as breeding ground. Facilities for visitors include a visitors' centre, towers for bird watching and nature trails.

Gallery

See also
 Protected areas of Estonia
 List of protected areas of Estonia
 List of Ramsar sites in Estonia

References

Nature reserves in Estonia
Protected areas established in 1985
1985 establishments in the Soviet Union
Järva Parish
Jõgeva Parish
Põltsamaa Parish
Väike-Maarja Parish
Ramsar sites in Estonia
Geography of Järva County
Geography of Jõgeva County
Geography of Lääne-Viru County
Tourist attractions in Järva County
Tourist attractions in Jõgeva County
Tourist attractions in Lääne-Viru County